This is a list of amphibians and reptiles found on Barbados, a Caribbean island-nation in the Lesser Antilles.  Barbados is largely flat and has been intensively cultivated for over 300 years.  This has left little natural vegetation on the island, leaving most species found there restricted to narrow habitats such as wooded gullies.

Amphibians
There are two species of amphibians on Barbados, at least one of which was introduced.

Frogs (Anura)

Reptiles
Including marine turtles and introduced species, there are 15 reptile species reported on Barbados, though two are possibly extinct.  The Barbados leaf-toed gecko (Phyllodactylus pulcher) and the Barbados threadsnake (Leptotyphlops carlae) are endemic, as was the probably extinct Barbados racer (Liophis perfuscus).  A fourth species, the Barbados anole (Anolis extremus), was endemic to Barbados but has been introduced to other islands.

Turtles (Testudines)

Lizards and snakes (Squamata)

See also
Fauna of Barbados

Notes

References
Note: All species listed above are supported by Malhotra & Thorpe 1999 and Government of Barbados 2002, unless otherwise cited.

.
.
 Fields, Angela and Julia A. Horrocks, "An Annotated Checklist of the Herpetofauna of Barbados". Journal of the Barbados Museum & Historical Society, Vol 55 pp. 263–283 2009

.

 
 Amphibians
Barbados
 Barbados
Barbados
amphibians and reptiles
Barbados
Barbados